Averdoingt is a commune in the Pas-de-Calais department in northern France.

Geography
A small farming village located 19 miles (30 km) west of Arras at the junction of the D81 and D81E roads.

Population

Sights
 The ruins of a 12th-century castle.
 The church of St. Leger, dating from the thirteenth century.

See also
Communes of the Pas-de-Calais department

References

Communes of Pas-de-Calais